Tony Banfield (December 18, 1938) is a former American football player.  A defensive back, he played college football at Oklahoma State University and professionally in the American Football League (AFL) for the Houston Oilers from  1960 through 1963 and in 1965.  In 1962, he returned a blocked punt 58 yards for a touchdown in the Oilers' 32–17 defeat of the Oakland Raiders. He was All-AFL in 1961 and 1962 and an American Football League Eastern Division All-Star in 1963.  Banfield played in the first three AFL Championship games, winning the title in 1960 and 1961.

See also
 List of American Football League players

References

1938 births
Living people
American football defensive backs
Houston Oilers players
Oklahoma State Cowboys football players
American Football League All-League players
American Football League All-Star players
People from Independence, Kansas
Players of American football from Kansas
American Football League players